Matthew 24 is the twenty-fourth chapter of the Gospel of Matthew in the New Testament of the Christian Bible. It commences the Olivet Discourse or "Little Apocalypse" spoken by Jesus Christ, also described as the Eschatological Discourse, which continues into chapter 25. It contains Jesus' prediction of the destruction of the Temple in Jerusalem. Mark 13 and Luke 21 also cover the same material.

Text 
The original text was written in Koine Greek. This chapter is divided into 51 verses.

Textual witnesses
Some early manuscripts containing the text of this chapter are:
Codex Vaticanus (AD 325–350)
Codex Sinaiticus (330-360)
Codex Bezae
Codex Washingtonianus
Codex Alexandrinus (-440)
Codex Ephraemi Rescriptus
Codex Purpureus Rossanensis (6th century)
Codex Sinopensis (6th century; extant: verses 3–12)
Papyrus 83 (6th century; extant: verses 1, 6)

Old Testament references
 Matthew 24:15: ; 
 Matthew 24:35: Isaiah 51:6

Context
In the preceding chapters (chapters 21–23), Jesus has been teaching in the Temple and debating with the Pharisees, Herodians and Sadducees.

Jesus predicts the destruction of the Temple
Jesus and his disciples leave the Temple, or the temple grounds in the New Living Translation. Theologian John Gill observes that Jesus was "never to return".

Arthur Carr reports that in descending the Kedron Valley, to the east of the temple, and then ascending the slope of the Mount of Olives, the disciples could look back and see "the Temple [rising] with its colonnade of dazzling white marble, surmounted with golden roof and pinnacles, and founded on a substructure of huge stones".

In this "introductory scene " (verses 1-2), Jesus predicts that "not one stone shall be left here upon another". The prediction follows the sentiments expressed by Jesus in :
O Jerusalem, Jerusalem ... See! Your house is left to you desolate.

Methodism's founder John Wesley says that the prediction was "most punctually fulfilled" in that the majority of the temple buildings were burned and then dug up on the orders of the invading Roman general Titus in 70 AD.

Mount of Olives
Jesus and his disciples proceed to the Mount of Olives, where a "private" conversation takes place regarding "the end of the age". Jesus's words here are referred to as the "Little Apocalypse" or "Olivet Discourse." Jesus appears to have gone ahead of his disciples, who come to him to enquire about the timing and signification of his parousia (parousias).  states that only Peter, James, John, and Andrew came to speak with him.

Verse 5
For many will come in My name, saying, 'I am the Christ,' and will deceive many.
'I am Christ,' lacking the definite article, in the Geneva Bible (1599), the King James Version, and the New Matthew Bible  (a modernised version of the New Testament of William Tyndale). Carr (1882 onwards) observes that "the Christ, the Messiah" is correct, departing from the King James Version then in use.

Verse 15
Therefore when you see the 'abomination of desolation', spoken of by Daniel the prophet, standing in the holy place" (whoever reads, let him understand) 
The "abomination of desolation" is alternatively described as the "desolating sacrifice" in the New Revised Standard Version.

Verse 20
Pray that your flight may not be in winter or on a sabbath.
The hardship associated with escape during winter is likely to arise from bad weather. Dale Allison notes the absence of any explanation as to why flight on a sabbath day might also be more challenging; he suggests that Matthew's community might still have observed the sabbath as a day of rest, with its traditional travel restrictions, and been both hesitant and unprepared for flight on such a day.

Verses 29-31
"Immediately after the tribulation of those days shall the sun be darkened, the moon shall not give its light, and the stars shall fall from heaven, and the powers of the heavens shall be shaken.
And then shall appear the sign of the Son of Man in heaven; and then shall all the tribes of the earth mourn, and they shall see the Son of Man coming in the clouds of heaven with power and great glory.
And he shall send his angels with a great sound of a trumpet."
In the Bahá'í Faith, Bahá'u'lláh gives an interpretation of Matthew 24:29-31 in his major theological work Kitáb-i-Íqán (The Book of Certitude), giving detailed explanations about the allegorical meanings of each of these phrases.

Verse 35
Heaven and earth shall pass away, but my words shall not pass away.
Jesus's words refer to an Old Testament saying recorded in Isaiah 51:6:
For the heavens will vanish away like smoke,
The earth will grow old like a garment,
And those who dwell in it will die in like manner;
But My salvation will be forever,
And My righteousness will not be abolished.

See also 
 Noah
 Noah's Ark
 Noah's Flood
 Other related Bible parts: Genesis 6, Genesis 7, Isaiah 51, Jeremiah 15, Daniel 11, Daniel 12, Matthew 25, Mark 13, Luke 12, Luke 17, Luke 21, 2 Peter 3
 Rapture

References

External links
 King James Bible - Wikisource
English Translation with Parallel Latin Vulgate
Online Bible at GospelHall.org (ESV, KJV, Darby, American Standard Version, Bible in Basic English)
Multiple Bible versions at Bible Gateway (NKJV, NIV, NRSV etc.)

 
Gospel of Matthew chapters